, commonly abbreviated to Kaden, is a Japanese biographical record of the Fujiwara clan. Compiled by Fujiwara no Nakamaro and Enkei, it was completed between 760 and 766. It is two volumes in length.

Contents

It records the biography of Fujiwara no Kamatari, the ancestor of the Fujiwara clan. This is followed by accounts of his children, Jōe and Fuhito. However, only the Jōe passage survives.

It records the biography of Fujiwara no Muchimaro.

The text is viewed as a valuable supplemental historical source as it contains a number of anecdotal incidents not found elsewhere in historical records.

Notes

References
 Bauer, Mikael (2020). The History of the Fujiwara House. Kent, UK: Renaissance Books. pp. 39–40. .

External links
 Original text

Old Japanese texts
8th-century history books
8th-century Japanese books